Operation Oyster was a bombing raid made by the Royal Air Force (RAF) on 6 December 1942 upon the Philips works at Eindhoven, Netherlands. The Philips company was a major producer of electronics equipment, including vacuum tubes for radio communication. Prior to the Battle of the Netherlands in 1940, Philips was known to be a leading research firm in infrared and radar technology. To ensure accuracy and minimise casualties among the Dutch citizens, the raid had to be undertaken during the day.

Eindhoven was beyond the range of the fighter escort and the four-engined night bombers that made up the bulk of RAF Bomber Command were considered to be too vulnerable for the attack.  No. 2 Group RAF which contained the medium day bombers of the RAF were selected for the raid. To improve their chance of survival, diversionary raids were organised to mislead the German defenders. Almost all of 2 Group was committed to the raid and it was the largest and most successful operation by the group of the war.

Background

Philips, Eindhoven

In April 1942 the Air Ministry, in consultation with the Ministry of Economic Warfare, produced a list of the highest value targets in the occupied countries. Eight targets within range of the RAF were identified. The Philips radio and vacuum tube factory in Eindhoven was made the priority target, considered as important as any target in Germany. Philips was a leading firm in electronics and a big employer in Eindhoven, where production was performed at the massive Strijp works, and the smaller Emmasingel works, half a mile away to the south-east. Prior to the war Philips made major advances in the design and production of vacuum tubes and had some of the best research scientists in the world. An appraisal by the Air Ministry estimated that the plants in Eindhoven produced a third of the radio tubes used in German military equipment. It was feared that the firm was being used to perform research into electronic counter-measures and radar technology.

The location of the Philips works in the middle of a Dutch city precluded Bomber Command from putting on a large scale raid at night, as this would result in a great many civilian casualties. For accurate bombing the target would have to be attacked during the day. The raid resulted in about 150 civilian casualties. Using Lancaster bombers for the raid was considered and rejected, as they were too vulnerable to fly through the middle of the German fighter belt in daylight. The use of de Havilland Mosquitos was also considered, but the Philips works was too large a target for the payload the Mosquitos available could carry.

2 Group

No. 2 Group RAF was the sole day bomber group of RAF Bomber Command and consisted of ten medium bomber squadrons stationed on airfields in Norfolk. Daylight raids with small formations attacked shipping, targets on the coast and in northern France. The raids were flown at medium altitudes through the German fighter defences but the two large Philips plants in Eindhoven could not be destroyed by the typical twelve-aircraft formations used in Circus raids. Bomber Command elected to commit all ten squadrons of 2 Group to the raid but this meant using four types of medium bomber; the Lockheed Ventura, Douglas Boston, North American B-25 Mitchell and de Havilland Mosquito, with inconsistent performances. It was the most ambitious raid ever put on by 2 Group and approval for the raid was given on 9 November 1942 as Operation Oyster.

Prelude

Training

The first full scale practice was held on 17 November. The Ventura crews soon learned that the backwash off the paddled blades of the other Venturas made their planes liable to skid and difficult to control; flying so low left no time for recovery. Any mistake they made could quickly lead to them flying into the North Sea or the ground. Pilots had to be very attentive to stay on station, focused on the wing or tail of the aircraft before him. The lead pilot had to be cognizant of the trailing aircraft, accounting for their position with each manoeuvre he made. While flying low over Holland the pilots and navigators would have to keep a sharp eye out for obstructions. An additional risk of low-level flying was birdstrikes. Birds on the coast tended to be larger, and when startled by the noise of an aircraft engine they would take off into the air. The risk of bird strikes was one of 2 Group's greatest dangers.

The initial plan was for the Venturas to attack first, followed by Bostons at one target and Mitchells and Mosquitos at the other. The first trial was disappointing,  aircraft arrived over the target from different directions and at different times. The Venturas arrived over the target in a ragged fashion. It was apparent that time was needed for the aircraft to form up into groups by type. It was also apparent the Mitchell crews were simply not ready to fly a raid this demanding in air discipline. It was realised that if the Venturas attacked first with incendiaries, smoke from the fires they started would obscure the target for the following aircraft.

The order of the attacking aircraft was changed, the Bostons to attack first, followed by the Mitchells and Mosquitos, with the Venturas arriving last. Take-off times were also pushed forward to allow the aircraft more time to orbit and form up. A second trial run by the Venturas the next day was much better. Between exercises crews practised bombing at low level,  and 1,500 feet in all manner of formations in pairs and combinations of three pairs. A third trial run with all forces on 20 November was much better but the Mitchell squadrons, 98 and 180, were removed from the raid as their crews were still too inexperienced. This brought the force down to 8 squadrons.

Plan

The order for the attack and initial plan were issued 17 November 1942. Training for the raid began immediately. Wing Commander James Pelly-Fry of 88 Squadron was chosen to lead the attack. He was an experienced pilot who had flown in Africa and been in command of 88 Squadron since the start of the year. Pelly was to fly one of the two low level lead Bostons against the Emmasingel factory, and would be the first man to the target. Circus raids by 2 Group involved from six to 30 bombers, flying at medium altitudes and rendezvousing with their fighter escorts on the way. To strike with the element of surprise, the Eindhoven raid was to be flown at low level from start to finish. Low level flight would avoid radar detection, limit the exposure to anti-aircraft fire and make it more difficult for German fighters to attack.

None of the crews had experience flying a mission in such a large formation, nor so low to the ground. The four types of bombers being used had different ranges and different top speeds. To overwhelm the defences at the target and limit losses it was planned that all aircraft would be over the target, deliver their bombs and be gone in ten minutes. This would require careful planning; the Venturas were the slowest, the Bostons and Mitchells intermediate and the Mosquitos the fastest. The plan was based on the constraints of the performance of the Venturas, which would be operating close to their maximum range at Eindhoven. The aircraft were to fly in pairs, in echelon formation to starboard. As many as six aircraft could be grouped but no more as formation flying was awkward and made it difficult for any kind of manoeuvre. The big problem was getting a large group of aircraft to arrive at precise times. Formation flying was not new to the group but large formation flying at tree top level was. The attacking force was made up of 48 Venturas from 21 Squadron, 464 (Australian) Squadron and 487 (New Zealand) Squadron, 36 Bostons from 88 Squadron, 107 Squadron and 226 Squadron and ten Mosquitos from 105 and 139 Squadrons.

Though different speed ranges were assigned to the aircraft based on type, all aircraft were to approach, attack and leave the target at their maximum speed. Twelve Bostons, ten Mosquitos and thirty-one Venturas were to strike the main target at the Strijp Group works as twenty-four Bostons and seventeen Venturas were to attack the Emmasingel radio tube factory half a mile to the south-east of the main complex. Once the aircraft had released their bombs they were to hedge-hop home at full speed. It was decided after the third trial that a Boston from each squadron would fly at low level all the way to the target to draw the attention of German Flak gunners down and away from the larger force that was climbing up to 1,500 feet behind them. The low flyers' four  bombs were to be fused for eleven seconds delay to prevent the aircraft from being caught in the explosions. The incendiaries were phosphorus, which would stick to whatever they struck and burn.

The Mosquitos would follow the Bostons on the same route, while the Venturas were to fly slightly to the south before turning towards Eindhoven. The three groups were to arrive over the target in close succession. The attack was to be concluded within the span of 10 minutes. The Bostons were to release bombs at zero hour, which was set for  They were to be followed by the Mosquitos at zero plus 2 minutes and the Venturas would drop their bombs and incendiaries at zero plus 6 minutes. The Mosquitos were generally to fly north initially but were not bound to the other aircraft for the return trip.

Further efforts to protect the bombers involved diversionary raids by the United States Army Air Forces (USAAF), with a formation of Consolidated B-24 Liberator heavy bombers sent to the German airbase at Abbeville, and a larger formation of Boeing B-17 Flying Fortresses sent to Lille, with Spitfire escorts. Eight North American P-51 Mustang fighters were to undertake a "Rhubarb" (ground strafing attack). On the evening of Wednesday, 2 December, the crews were briefed on the raid; no-one was allowed to enter or leave the air bases, no mail was allowed out and the telephones were guarded. The next morning, Thursday 3 December, the RAF Meteorological office declared weather conditions were unsuitable. The stations remained closed as the crews waited for the weather to improve. Finally on Sunday 6 December the weather over Eindhoven was declared favourable.

Raid

Diversionary raids

An hour later the primary effort of 66 B-17s from the 91st, 303rd and 305th Bomb Groups were aloft to bomb the  rail yard at Lille. During these operations the Eighth Air Force used replacement crews to fly two mock runs over the channel to divert attention from the main effort, the diversions were made to look like routine operations.

The US bomber groups were detected and followed by German air controllers.  fighter aircraft from JG 1, JG 26 and JG 2 were sent up to intercept them. En route to Abbeville the B-24s of the 44th were recalled but one flight of six aircraft did not receive the message and continued. This flight was intercepted over the target and lost one of their B-24s but they reached the airfield, dropping their bombs at  Thirty-five minutes later the main force of B-17s rendezvoused with their Spitfire escorts, arrived over Lille and bombed the rail works at  Thirty-seven of the US bombers were considered effective on target. As they were exiting the target area they were attacked by some 20 to 30 enemy aircraft, losing one of their number.

Approach

From  the eight squadrons of 2 Group took off and kept below 100 feet in radio silence, formed up by type and headed for the coast. The Southwold Lighthouse served as a guide for the Bostons and Mosquitos, while the Venturas were plotted slightly to the south, passing over Orfordness Lighthouse, undetected by German radar operators. The raiders flew so low over the North Sea that they made a propeller wash. In 45 minutes the Dutch coast arose, appearing as a thin smudge upon the horizon. There were no large features to guide their approach. Landfall was intended to be at a small town called Colijnsplaat, at the mouth of the Oosterschelde estuary. The town sits on the north coast of the island Beveland. The leading Bostons arrived over the inlet, German flak batteries positioned along the coastline were taken by surprise and were only able to put up a thin fire as the Bostons passed by.

The Bostons followed their track up the Oosterschelde estuary, hugging the north coast for 30 miles to reach their main landfall at Bergen op Zoom. In the estuary, the first major hazard arose in the form of sea birds, which were startled by the sound of the aircraft approaching and rose into the air. The risk was known but the number and size of the birds was greater than anticipated. As the aircraft flew through them, some birds shattered wind screens, some penetrated cockpits and injured aircrew, others bent fuel pipes and caused wing damage. In one aircraft two gulls smashed through the nose Perspex, striking the navigator in the legs. The wind caught his maps and sucked them out the broken windscreen. The rest of the trip he was forced to navigate from memory.

Following three minutes behind were the Venturas. Alerted by the passage of the Bostons, the German gunners were ready when the Venturas arrived. Worse, the Venturas had missed their landfall and arrived a mile to the south over the island of Walcheren. German flak defences were concentrated along the coast and had been placed in considerably greater depth on Walcheren. Tracer fire laced out and the sea seemed to churn white below them. A tremendous splash threw water up into the air as a Ventura was struck and crashed into the sea. A few moments later a second was hit on the starboard side of the cockpit. The pilot was injured but was able to put the aircraft down in a ploughed field. A few of the fighters from II Gruppe/JG-1 were returning from the air battle over Lille when they came across the low flying bombers. Rudolph Rauhaus brought his Focke-Wulf 190 in behind a Ventura as it cleared Walcheren and damaged the aircraft, which crash landed on the Zealand peninsula Reimerswaal; three  of the six crew survived and were taken prisoner.

As the aircraft approached the top of the estuary they came within sight of the Woensdrecht airfield, the home of II Gruppe, just to the south of Bergen op Zoom. As they flew past it German Focke-Wulfs could be seen taking off from the airfield, banking and turning towards them. Mosquito pilot Charles Patterson commented,

Hugging the ground, the aircraft continued south–east into Belgium, sideslipping and weaving as they went. They kept low, rising up slightly to help clear hedges and houses. Pilots worked with their navigators, each pointing out trees, chimneys, high-tension cables and other obstructions to avoid.

Following the Bostons, the pilots in the Mosquitos observed enemy aircraft approaching from the airfield. Squadron Leader D. Parry and Flight Lieutenant W. Blessing turned toward them. They closed in a moment and soon were being fired upon. Banking and pushing throttles full on, they accelerated. The Focke-Wulf 190 had a similar speed to the Mosquito. Parry went flat out, keeping an eye on his pursuers. Eluding his attackers, he was able to rejoin the attack. Blessing, on the other hand, was chased for ten minutes. He was able to get away but was too late to resume the mission and returned to base with his bombs.

Pelly led the Bostons and trailing Mosquitos toward Turnhout. Flying at high speed and very low altitude was a navigational nightmare. If his line was wrong and he failed to lead them in to the target, coming around again would be a disaster. Reaching Turnhout he turned north-east to fly the 24 miles that would bring his squadron to Eindhoven. On the mission maps Pelly had noticed a rail line running in to Eindhoven from the south. He was desperate to find it. To his great relief, arising in the distance in front of him he saw a puff of white smoke, the telltale sign of a railway engine. Coming up he stayed to the left of the raised embankment of the rail line. As they reached Eindhoven two sets of very large factory buildings loomed up before them. The 24 Bostons from 88 and 226 Squadrons headed for Emmasingel. Splitting off to the left, the 12 Bostons from 107 Squadron followed Squadron Leader R.J. McLachlan for the big buildings at Strijp.

Attack

Behind them was the Mosquito group, due to arrive on target at Zero plus 2. They had to be careful to check their speed to avoid overtaking the Bostons. Behind these came the Venturas, who had taken a slightly longer route to Oostmalle to stretch the time before turning toward Eindhoven. They would stay on the deck and deliver their incendiaries upon the factory rooftops. Pelly-Fry and his wingman led 88 and 226 Squadrons in to the Emmasingel works. Their aircraft came under fire from German anti-aircraft and machine-guns mounted on the roofs of the buildings. They returned fire with their own machine-guns. Behind them, their squadron mates climbed to 1,500 feet to get ready for their shallow dive attack. Pelly came up on the factory and delivered his bomb load, but as he cleared overhead his aircraft was hit hard in the starboard engine and wing. The wing dropped and he found he was flying the aircraft at a 90 degree vertical from the ground. Struggling to regain control, he was slowly able to get his wings level. Pelly stated the aircraft felt very sluggish, and he had a hard time bringing it to port. While the time delay fuses ran down, he left the area with full power on, heading north.

It had been a quiet Sunday afternoon in Eindhoven; no air raid sirens had been sounded. The day before had been St. Nicolas Day and families were sitting down to lunch. The first sign that something was amiss was the steady humming sound of synchronised engines growing steadily louder, a telltale sign of approaching British aircraft. People began to come out to see what was happening. In a moment the loud firing of German anti-aircraft guns shattered the peace, soon answered by the machine guns of the approaching British bombers. Those near the factory were soon scrambling back inside their homes, as bombs began exploding behind them. The Bostons of 88 and 226 Squadrons had climbed to 1,500 feet. Pilot Jack Peppiatt of 88 Squadron confessed he felt extremely vulnerable up there. Levelling off, they dropped into a shallow dive and released their bombs, each aircraft delivering their four 500 pound bombs between 12:30 and 12:33. The attack was concentrated into a very short window of time. The factory shook and smoke began to fill the air.

A similar attack was carried out by the Bostons of 107 Squadron against the  works. Jarred by the explosions, the Strijp tower clock stopped at 12:32. It remained stuck there, at 12:32, for the rest of the war. With bombs gone, the Bostons dropped to the deck and followed Pelly-Fry, who was heading north. This had been the plan, but only for a couple of miles. Then they were to turn west for the coast. Strangely, Pelly-Fry continued heading north. The Bostons followed him. Behind the Bostons came the Mosquitos, who were working to avoid overtaking them. Due to arrive on target just after the Bostons, they also climbed to 1,500 feet. As they were climbing to bombing height they were attacked by a group of three Focke-Wulfs. The Mosquito was the one aircraft in the raid that carried no armament. One of the Mosquitos turned away to run, and was chased by the German fighters. Going flat out he was able to avoid taking any damage, while pulling the German fighters away from the slower Bostons. The remaining Mosquitos dropped their bombs on the  works, dropped to the deck and looked for a way out.

Following both groups were the Venturas, carrying their incendiaries in for a low level attack at Zero plus 6. As they came up behind the initial attack, there was no problem finding the direction to the target, as smoke billowed into the air. However, flying through that environment and delivering their bombs on target was another matter. The smoke obscured the buildings and made it difficult to avoid obstructions. As the Venturas began releasing their incendiaries the fires accelerated, and it was increasingly hard to see. A number of pilots strained to get their aircraft up over the structures. One of the Venturas attacking the   complex took a hit and flew into a cloud of smoke. In the darkness it flew straight into a building and exploded. Fire, smoke and bombing aircraft filled the air. Another Ventura was seen to get hit, catch fire and fly straight through a Dutch house, erupting in a fiery explosion as it came out the other side. Another was seen by a following aircraft to deliver its incendiaries, only to have some of the phosphorus splatter onto its tail and set the tail ablaze. It dived into the earth and exploded. They were delivering their ordnance, but were suffering higher losses. Pilot Stephen Roche noted "The flak and machine-gun fire were terrific, and once we bombed it was every man to himself." German gunners on roof tops were seen to fire their guns as the buildings they were standing on burned out underneath them or exploded. Several other Venturas were lost in the attack. Having released their bombs, the aircraft dived to ground level and hedge-hopped for home.

Pelly-Fry's aircraft, hit during the bomb run, had its starboard aileron shot off, making turns to port very difficult to do. While he struggled for control his course took him north. The trailing Bostons followed him right past the turn point. Soon they were trying to figure out what was going on. They were to clear the target area by flying north for a couple of miles, and then make a hard turn west for the coast. Instead they found themselves continuing north, toward Rotterdam. The north route to the coast was longer, and the port was heavily defended. Their Spitfire escorts would be waiting for them over Colijnsplaat. Eventually a number of the Bostons banked away and headed west. The rest followed north to Rotterdam. Soon they were dodging the tall cranes of the shipping yards, a dangerous undertaking, but they all managed to get through. The Mosquitoes followed the Bostons in for their bomb run on the  works. Patterson recalled,

The Mosquito crews were at liberty to choose their own route home to the north on this mission.

Withdrawal

Much faster and with no defensive armament, it made no sense to tie the Mosquitos to the Bostons and Venturas. After initially flying north some turned to the west. Coming up behind the Bostons the Mosquitos could see them weaving and sliding. The Bostons were flying low and as fast as possible, with the hazards now increased by the addition of German fighters. They were lucky not to have any collisions. Said Boston pilot Jack Peppiatt "After a few minutes settling down it all went up with a bang as Fw 190s appeared. Without doubt the next 20 minutes or so were full of action and not a little confusion. Some 10 or 20 aircraft were screaming along, full throttle in a loose mass. No one wanted to be at the back where the Focke-Wulfs were coming in to attack and wheeling away for another go." The Bostons were soon joined by a number of Mosquitos, who looked to gain protection from their defensive firepower, but soon thought the better of it and sped past them. Thankfully the attacks in back were crimped for lack of altitude. Coming in from above they had to turn away early to the side, as there was no room below to dive through the group.

Except for the bomb run, a pilot never flew straight and level over enemy territory. The rear gunner served as the pilot's eyes in back. For a crew to make it home, the rear gunner had to see the enemy fighter, and as he closed in the gunner would wait, calling out to the pilot just as the fighter was preparing to fire. The gunner would fire his .303 machine guns, but accuracy was difficult with the aeroplane jerking about, and of a markedly secondary importance for the survival of the crew. In the running fight to the coast, pilots slid and weaved, keeping an ear out for the cry of "Jink!" Flak picked up again as they reached the coast and followed them out over the sea. One Boston was hit and crashed; as they pulled away larger calibre guns joined in, creating huge splashes with their shells in hopes of knocking an aeroplane down with the spray. This was frightening to the crews, many of whom thought the splashes were the result of their fellow aircraft falling, but they managed to all get clear.

The Mosquitos scattered along different return routes. Patterson decided it might be safer to avoid the planned route the Bostons were taking, as enemy fighters might have gathered over the west coast to intercept them. He headed north for the Zuider Zee, looking to hook around west past the gap at Den Helder. Fellow Mosquito pilot John O'Grady followed him. O'Grady was a young pilot from Canada who had trained under Patterson at an operational training unit. The two aircraft travelled north over the causeway low and fast, 20 feet over the water. As they approached the choke point where the southern tip of Texel approached Den Helder the Germans situated there put up a fierce barrage of flak. Patterson managed to fly through it unscathed, but O'Grady's aircraft was hit. They continued on, but a short way out over the North Sea Patterson's navigator called out "He's gone into the sea!" Patterson circled back, but all he could find was broiling water where his friend's aircraft had disappeared.

German fighters had in fact gathered off the coast along the Bostons' route. Wing Commander Peter Dutton, the CO of 107 Squadron, was shot down 6 kilometres out from Katwijk aan Zee. Two more from 107 were lost from fighter attacks over the water. Another from 226 Squadron was lost off Scheveningen.

Aftermath

Analysis

The Eindhoven raid was a success which took the German defenders by surprise. Low level navigation was excellent and around 83 per cent of the aircraft involved delivered  bombs with a high degree of accuracy and concentration. Reconnaissance photographs obtained later showed severe damage to the factory. The losses suffered by 2 Group meant that the operation would be unique. Operation Oyster is remembered as 2 Group's most famous and successful operation of the war. Both factory complexes suffered significant damage and production was stopped.

For Frits Philips, chairman of Philips, the destruction came as a shock. Dutch nationalists like Philips had to walk a tightrope. He had to give the appearance of collaborating with his German occupiers, while providing a minimal effort in support of the German war industry. Philips had been hamstringing the plant's production for some time, but the overstated reports he had been sending to Germany had apparently found their way to the Air Ministry. Facing the reality of the destruction the following morning, Philips' first concern was that his skilled workers would be removed to Germany. He immediately set about putting his people to work clearing the debris, providing his German overseers with optimistic projections of the plant's return to function. He made certain the repairs proceeded in a deliberate manner. In May the following year the Gestapo put Philips in a concentration camp for five months because he had failed to put an end to a strike. The RAF sent ten Mosquitos to revisit the Philips plants on 30 March 1943 to slow the recovery. It took six months to restore production.

Subsequent events
Back in England, the returning aircraft were met at their airfields by waiting newspapermen, who swarmed about the crews and took pictures of the damaged aeroplanes. That night parties were held, and a concert given with household names from the world of radio entertainment. The next day the raid was celebrated in the press; the crews were all placed on a three-day leave. Eindhoven was liberated on 18 September 1944. An intelligence inspection of the Philips plants noted the passive resistance of the Philips leadership and the distrust of their German overseers. It asserted the most effective sabotage agency in action at Philips had in fact been the German system of allocation and control.

Casualties

Aircrew losses were 62 men; nine Venturas, four Bostons and a Mosquito were lost, including one in the sea and another crashed in England, a loss rate of 16 per cent. Thirty-seven Venturas, thirteen Bostons and three Mosquitoes were damaged, seven seriously, 57 per cent of the force. The Venturas had a 20 per cent loss rate and three crash-landings in England, a loss rate that could not be sustained. Few losses and little damage were caused by German fighters, the bombers proving difficult targets at low level; one Mosquito was intercepted by a Fw 190 as it approached Eindhoven and abandoned its bombing run after evading the Fw 190 until the pilot gave up the chase near Flushing. At least 31 aircraft had bird strikes, some hit trees and several Venturas probably hit houses when bombing through smoke; light flak damaged some aircraft and possibly shot down others. The group had to stand down for ten days while aircraft were repaired and losses replaced. A B-17 and a B-24 were lost in the two diversionary raids, along with one of the escorting Spitfires; a Fw 190 was shot down.
Civilian casualties were 150 and 7 German soldiers.

References
Notes

Citations

Bibliography

Further reading

External links
 Charles Patterson film clips from Eindhoven raid, 1942
 Gaumont-British News: Bomber Command Wreck the famous Philips Radio Works at Eindhoven, 1942
 Pathe: RAF Raid Holland In Daylight, 1942
 Movietone News: Nazi war factory wrecked by RAF, 1942

Eindhoven
Oyster
Oyster
Oyster
December 1942 events
History of the Royal Air Force during World War II
1942 in Germany
Eindhoven